Pseudopsallus is a genus of plant bugs in the family Miridae. There are more than 20 described species in Pseudopsallus.

Species
These 26 species belong to the genus Pseudopsallus:

 Pseudopsallus abroniae Knight, 1930
 Pseudopsallus angularis (Uhler, 1894)
 Pseudopsallus anograe Knight, 1930
 Pseudopsallus artemisicola Knight, 1930
 Pseudopsallus atriseta (Van Duzee, 1916)
 Pseudopsallus badger Stonedahl & Schwartz, 1988
 Pseudopsallus daleae (Knight, 1968)
 Pseudopsallus dememsus (Van Duzee, 1925)
 Pseudopsallus demensus (Van Duzee, 1925)
 Pseudopsallus enceliae Stonedahl & Schwartz, 1986
 Pseudopsallus greggii Schwartz, 2005
 Pseudopsallus hixsoni (Knight, 1969)
 Pseudopsallus lajuntae Stonedahl & Schwartz, 1986
 Pseudopsallus lattini Stonedahl & Schwartz, 1986
 Pseudopsallus major (Knight, 1969)
 Pseudopsallus mojaviensis Stonedahl & Schwartz, 1986
 Pseudopsallus occidentalis Stonedahl & Schwartz, 1986
 Pseudopsallus plagiatus (Knight, 1968)
 Pseudopsallus presidio Stonedahl & Schwartz, 1986
 Pseudopsallus puberus (Uhler, 1894)
 Pseudopsallus repertus (Uhler, 1895)
 Pseudopsallus sericatus (Uhler, 1895)
 Pseudopsallus stitti (Knight, 1968)
 Pseudopsallus tiquiliae Schwartz, 2005
 Pseudopsallus tulare Stonedahl & Schwartz, 1988
 Pseudopsallus viridicans (Knight, 1930)

References

Further reading

 
 
 

Miridae genera
Articles created by Qbugbot
Orthotylini